Dalseong Bin clan is one of the Korean clans. Their Bon-gwan is in Suseong District, Daegu. According to the research held in 2015, the number of Dalseong Bin clan’s member was 4208. Their founder was  who was a Hanlin Academy in Song dynasty. When Song dynasty was collapsed, he was naturalized in Goryeo having his valuable books. Then, he made contributions to developing academy. As a result, Chungsuk of Goryeo appointed  as Prince of Suseong.

See also 
 Korean clan names of foreign origin

References

External links 
 

 
Bin clans
Korean clan names of Chinese origin